Ann Dibble Jordan (née Dibble; born 1935) is an American company director and former social worker.

Social work
Jordan is secretary of the board for Sasha Bruce Youthwork. She was an associate professor at the School of Social Service Administration of the University of Chicago from 1970 to 1987, director of social services of Chicago Lying-in Hospital from 1970 to 1985, and director of the Department of Social Services for the University of Chicago Medical Center from 1986 to 1987.

Business
Jordan is vice chairman and secretary of WETA-TV, and an honorary trustee of the University of Chicago and The Brookings Institution in Washington, D.C. She is the former chairman of the National Symphony Orchestra, and former trustee of the Memorial Sloan-Kettering Cancer Center.

She was field work director of Citigroup from 1989 to 2007. She is a former director of Revlon, Inc., Johnson & Johnson, Automatic Data Processing, Coleman Company, Salant Corp., Travelers Group Inc. and The Phillips Collection. She was a recipient of the American Woman Award from the Women's Research & Education Institute in 2004.

Politics
With her husband she organized a Democratic fundraiser in 1994 that raised $3 million. She co-chaired President Bill Clinton's Inauguration committee in 1996.

In 2004, she was one of the five-member board of directors of the Clinton Foundation.

Personal life
She married Vernon Jordan in 1986, and has five children and nine grandchildren. She is a member of The Links.

References

1935 births
American social workers
American women in business
Clinton Foundation people
Living people
University of Chicago faculty
American women academics
21st-century American women